This is an index for the list of films produced in Malaysia ordered by decade on separate pages. For an alphabetical listing of Malaysian films see :Category:Malaysian films.

Before 1960
List of Malaysian films before 1960

1960s
List of Malaysian films of the 1960s

1970s
List of Malaysian films of the 1970s

1980s
List of Malaysian films of the 1980s

1990s
List of Malaysian films of the 1990s

2000s
List of Malaysian films of the 2000s
List of Malaysian films of 2000
List of Malaysian films of 2001
List of Malaysian films of 2002
List of Malaysian films of 2003
List of Malaysian films of 2004
List of Malaysian films of 2005
List of Malaysian films of 2006
List of Malaysian films of 2007
List of Malaysian films of 2008
List of Malaysian films of 2009

2010s
List of Malaysian films of the 2010s
List of Malaysian films of 2010
List of Malaysian films of 2011
List of Malaysian films of 2012
List of Malaysian films of 2013
List of Malaysian films of 2014
List of Malaysian films of 2015
List of Malaysian films of 2016
List of Malaysian films of 2017
List of Malaysian films of 2018
List of Malaysian films of 2019

2020s
List of Malaysian films of the 2020s
List of Malaysian films of 2020
List of Malaysian films of 2021
List of Malaysian films of 2022
List of Malaysian films of 2023
List of Malaysian films of 2024
List of Malaysian films of 2025
List of Malaysian films of 2026
List of Malaysian films of 2027
List of Malaysian films of 2028
List of Malaysian films of 2029

See also
Cinema of Malaysia
List of highest-grossing films in Malaysia

External links
Malaysian film at the Internet Movie Database
Malaysian Feature Films Finas
Cinema Online Malaysia
10 Great Malaysian Films You Should Watch at theculturetrip.com
Film in Malaysia